Giuseppe De Notaris (18 April 1805, Milan – 22 January 1877) was an Italian botanist generally known for his work with cryptogams native to Italy.

He studied medicine at the University of Pavia, obtaining his medical degree in 1830. Having developed an interest in botany, by 1832 he had abandoned the field of medicine. In 1836 he accepted an assignment at the botanical garden in Turin, and a few years later, was named professor of botany and director of the botanical garden at the University of Genoa (1839). In 1872 he was appointed chair of botany at the University of Rome.

In the field of mycology, he proposed the fungi family Hypocreaceae (1845). With Antonio Bey Figari (1804-1870), he described numerous species from the family Poaceae. With Figari, he was the binomial co-author of the grass genus Schistachne (synonym Stipagrostis). Organisms with the specific epithet of notarisiana commemorate his name.

Selected works 
 Muscologiae italicae spicilegium, 1837.              
 Syllabus muscorum in Italia et in insulis circumstantibus hucusque cognitorum, 1838.
 Florula Caprariae : sive, Enumeratio plantarum in insula Capraria : vel sponte nascentium vel ad utilitatem latius excultarum, 1839 (with Giuseppe Giacinto Moris).
 Repertorium florae Ligusticae, 1844.
 Agrostograhiae Aegyptiacae fragmenta, 1852 (with Antonio Bey Figari).
 Musci italici, 1862.
 Sferiacei italici, 1863.
 Epilogo della Briologia Italiana, 1869.

See also
 :Category:Taxa named by Giuseppe De Notaris

References 

1805 births
1877 deaths
Scientists from Milan
Academic staff of the Sapienza University of Rome
Academic staff of the University of Genoa
University of Pavia alumni
19th-century Italian botanists
Italian mycologists
Bryologists
Pteridologists